Jules Moy (1862–1938) was a French stage and film actor.

Selected filmography
 The Vein (1928)
 Cagliostro (1929)
 Mistigri (1931)
 The Man at Midnight (1931)
 Let's Touch Wood (1933)
Bach the Detective (1936)
 The Marriages of Mademoiselle Levy (1936)

References

Bibliography
 Robert Tanitch. Oscar Wilde on Stage and Screen. Methuen, 1999.

External links

1862 births
1938 deaths
French male film actors
French male silent film actors
20th-century French male actors
French male stage actors
Male actors from Paris